Cristóbal Martí Batalla (born 22 May 1903 – 28 July 1986) was a Spanish football player and manager.

Career
Born in Granollers, Catalonia, Martí began playing football with CE Sabadell FC before joining FC Barcelona. He made more than 250 official appearances for Barcelona, winning La Liga during the 1928–29 season. After the 1932–33 season, Martí joined RCD Espanyol where he played until the outbreak of the Spanish civil war.

International career
Martí made three appearances for the Spain national football team during 1930 and 1931. He also played for the Catalonia national football team, and he was part of the team that won two Prince of Asturias Cups (an inter-regional competition) in the 1920s, winning the competition in 1923-24 and in 1926. Martí scored the only goal in the semi-final of the 1923-24 edition against Biscay before helping the Catalan team to beat a Castile/Madrid XI in the final.

Managerial career
After he retired from playing, Martí became a football coach. He managed Racing de Santander, Real Oviedo and RCD Mallorca.

Honours

Club
FC Barcelona
Spanish Cup: 1925
Catalan Champions: 1923–24, 1924–25, 1929–30, 1930–31, 1931–32

International
Catalan XI
Prince of Asturias Cup: 1923-24 and 1926

References

1903 births
1986 deaths
Spanish footballers
Spain international footballers
CE Sabadell FC footballers
FC Barcelona players
RCD Espanyol footballers
La Liga players
Association football fullbacks
Association football wingers
Spanish football managers
Racing de Santander managers
Real Oviedo managers
RCD Mallorca managers
Footballers from Granollers
Catalonia international footballers